Robert Justus Kleberg, Jr. (December 5, 1853 – October 10, 1932) was born to Rose and Robert J. Kleberg in Texas and attended the University of Virginia. He served as legal counsel to Richard King and his  King Ranch. When King died, Kleberg took over the management of the ranch in 1885. He also encouraged the B. F. Yoakum company of St. Louis to build a railroad in South Texas. Eventually oil was discovered under much of this cattle country. His son, Richard M. Kleberg, had recently been elected to the U.S. House of Representatives (in 1931), which was mentioned in Time magazine issue of 17 October 1932 which reported the elder Kleberg's death.

References

External links

1853 births
1932 deaths
Businesspeople from Texas
Kleberg family
Ranchers from Texas
Texas lawyers
University of Virginia alumni